Freddy Mombongo-Dues (born 30 August 1985) is a Congolese footballer who plays for Patro Eisden Maasmechelen in the Belgian Second Amateur Division.

Career

Club
On 27 July 2011, Mombongo-Dues signed a one-year contract, with the option of a second, with Belgian Pro League side Mons. After only six months with Mons, Mombongo-Dues moved to fellow Pro League side Royal Antwerp on 31 January 2012, signing a 2.5-year contract. After his Antwerp contract expired, Mombongo-Dues moved to AZAL PFK of the Azerbaijan Premier League on 25 August 2014, signing a two-year contract.

Career statistics

Club

References

1985 births
Living people
Democratic Republic of the Congo footballers
1. FC Köln II players
Bonner SC players
Wuppertaler SV players
K.A.S. Eupen players
R.A.E.C. Mons players
Royal Antwerp F.C. players
AZAL PFK players
FC Viktoria Köln players
SV Waldhof Mannheim players
Royale Union Saint-Gilloise players
RFC Liège players
K. Patro Eisden Maasmechelen players
Belgian Pro League players
Challenger Pro League players
Expatriate footballers in Azerbaijan
Expatriate footballers in Belgium
Expatriate footballers in Germany
Democratic Republic of the Congo expatriate footballers
Democratic Republic of the Congo expatriate sportspeople in Belgium
Association football forwards
Footballers from Kinshasa
21st-century Democratic Republic of the Congo people